The Average Service Availability Index (ASAI) is a reliability index commonly used by electric power utilities. ASAI is calculated as

ASAI can be represented in relation to SAIDI (when the annual SAIDI is given in hours, 8760 is the number of hours in a year)

References

Electric power distribution
Reliability indices